This is a list of countries ranked by the market capitalization of listed domestic companies, which is simply the sum of market capitalizations of all domestic public companies listed in stock exchanges present in that country. As inferred from the table, the United States is the leading country in terms of market capitalization of listed domestic companies, which stood at $30.4 trillion  in the year 2018.

List

References

Lists of countries by economic indicator